Three Rivers Independent School District is a public school district based in Three Rivers, Texas (USA). Located in Live Oak County, the district extends into a small portion of Bee County.

In 2009, the school district was rated "academically acceptable" by the Texas Education Agency.

Schools
Three Rivers Elementary School (Grades PK-6)
Three Rivers JR/SR School (Grades 7-12)

References

External links
 

School districts in Live Oak County, Texas
School districts in Bee County, Texas